Christmas on Honeysuckle Lane is a 2018 American-Canadian television film starring Alicia Witt and Colin Ferguson, based on the novel by Mary Elizabeth McDonough. The film premiered on Hallmark Channel and Hallmark Movies & Mysteries on November 24, 2018.

Plot
After their parents have died, Emma and her siblings spend a nostalgic Christmas in their family home before putting the house on Honeysuckle Lane up for sale.

Cast
 Alicia Witt as Emma
 Colin Ferguson as Morgan
 Laura Leighton as Andie
 Ariane Rinehart as Rumi
 Blair Busbee as Maureen
 Debra Lord Cooke as Grace
 Owen Dammacco as Marco
 Blair Lewin as Anne Marie
 Gary Lindemann as Cliff
 Fiona Morgan Quinn as Sophie
 Mary Beth McDonough as Caroline Reynolds
 David Boston as House Party Guest
 Courtney Gonzalez as Townsperson / Party Guest
 Michelle Patnode as Townsperson
 Bill Salvatore as Townsperson At Outdoor Concert
 Paul Tawczynski as Townsperson
 Katie Vandrilla as Townsperson

Notes
The filming location was in Old Wethersfield, Connecticut, and over the course of two weeks location in the town included Comstock Ferre and Co., the Silas Robbins Bed and Breakfast, the Webb-Deane-Stevens Museum.

References

External links
 
 
 Rotten Tomatoes

2018 television films
2018 films
American Christmas films
American television films
Hallmark Channel original films
Films shot in Connecticut
2010s English-language films